Lam Hin Ting (born 9 December 1999) is a Hong Kong professional footballer who currently plays as a holding midfielder for Hong Kong Premier League club Rangers.

Youth career
Lam spent one year of his football career at Hong Kong Barcelona Football School before spending the next eight years with Chelsea Soccer School. In March 2016, he went on a 20-day trial with Portuguese club Cova da Piedade. However, due to the language barrier between him and his teammates, he was unable to communicate with them and was not offered a contract.

Club career

R&F
Upon Lam's return to Hong Kong, he resumed his school education. Three days after his returned, he was contacted by R&F coach Leung Chi Wing who offered him a chance to play professional football at a RMB$6,000 per month salary. He agreed to the deal and trained with the team at its Sanshui base.

Lam was handed his first team debut 18 September 2016 in a Senior Shield match versus Hong Kong Sapling and at age 16, became the youngest player to appear in the competition. On 1 October, he made his first league appearance in a game against Pegasus.

In recognition of his performances, he was named a finalist for the Best Young Player award for 2016-17.

Dreams
After the conclusion of the 2016-17 season, Lam considered returning to Portugal for another trial. He ultimately decided to sign with Dreams, following Leung who had been named the manager of the club. He scored his first two goals for the club in a 4-2 win over Southern.

R&F
Following Dreams' decision to self-relegate, Lam rejoined R&F, signing a contract on 24 July 2019.

On 14 October 2020, Lam left the club after his club's withdrawal from the HKPL in the new season.

Happy Valley
On 10 November 2020, Lam signed with Happy Valley.

Rangers
On 14 July 2021, it was reported that Lam would sign with Rangers.

Disciplinary issues
Throughout his career, Lam has been on the end of supplemental discipline due to poor behaviour.

On 21 March 2021, Lam was sent off post-match for alleged sexual harassment of referee Gigi Law. This allegation was confirmed by the Hong Kong Football Association on 19 April 2021 and Lam was banned 10 matches.

On 28 December 2021, the HKFA banned Lam from representing Hong Kong for one year and fined him $6,000 after it emerged that Lam and his teammates broke team rules and violated COVID-19 protocols during the 2022 AFC U-23 Asian Cup qualification tournament in Japan.

On 10 September 2022, videos began circulating on the internet of Lam tossing his kit at a referee after being sent off in a local futsal match. Rangers responded by suspending Lam indefinitely for his actions and for participating in football activity without permission from the club.

Honours

Individual
Best Young Player: 2018

References

External links

Lam Hin Ting at HKFA

1999 births
Living people
Hong Kong footballers
Association football defenders
Hong Kong Premier League players
R&F (Hong Kong) players
Dreams Sports Club players
Happy Valley AA players
Hong Kong Rangers FC players
Association football fullbacks
Footballers at the 2018 Asian Games
Asian Games competitors for Hong Kong